HMS Exploit is an  (or P2000) patrol vessel of the British Royal Navy, built in Woolston by Vosper Thornycroft and commissioned in 1988. She is assigned to the Royal Navy Coastal Forces Squadron, carrying out a range of activities both in the U.K. and overseas.  

The ship's company consists of a permanent staff of the commanding officer, two senior rates and two junior rates, but can take up to twelve students with training officers usually embarked when conducting navigational training. Whilst at sea, students are able to put into practice navigation and seamanship skills they have learnt in the classroom during weekly training nights. These include chart planning, acting as Officer of the Watch, using the ship's radar and carrying out seamanship evolutions from anchoring to securing alongside. Instruction is given in engineering, firefighting, damage control and ship handling. The ship is based in HMNB Portsmouth.

Operational history

Royal Naval Auxiliary Service
XSV Exploit was originally ordered for the now defunct Royal Naval Auxiliary Service (RNXS) and had a distinctive black hull like other RNXS vessels.

On 19 March 1994, a serious machinery space fire occurred on Exploit approximately 30 miles of Lundy island as she was being transferred to Portsmouth from Greenock as part of the managed run down of the service by RNXS crew. The Padstow lifeboat and the RAF SAR Helicopter from Chivenor, were scrambled, and a tanker on route to Milford Haven was diverted to help, but were not needed. The fire was later attributed to a major mechanical failure of the starboard main engine, resulting in a large hole in the sump casing. The fire spread quickly to the air ducts, igniting various rubber coolant pipes causing thick acrid smoke.

Royal Navy

Affiliations
  
 
 TS Blackcap - Birkenhead Sea Cadets
 TS Minerva -  Rhondda Sea Cadets
 TS Sutton Coldfield - Sutton Coldfield Sea Cadets
 Hereford Cathedral School CCF
 The University of Birmingham
 845 Naval Air Squadron
 The town of Berkeley
 Brownhills Girl Guides, Walsall

Notes

References

External links

 

Archer-class patrol vessels